No. 29 Squadron  (Scorpions) was a fighter squadron equipped with MiG-27UPG and based at Jodhpur AFS. The squadron was disbanded on 27 December 2019 with retirement of MiG-27.

History

Aircraft

References

029